Anatol Grinţescu (1 August 1939 – 2 June 2014) was a Romanian water polo player. He competed at the 1960 Summer Olympics and the 1964 Summer Olympics.

References

External links
 

1939 births
2014 deaths
Romanian male water polo players
Olympic water polo players of Romania
Water polo players at the 1960 Summer Olympics
Water polo players at the 1964 Summer Olympics
Sportspeople from Chișinău